Osasere Orumwense (born June 20, 1954) is a Nigerian academic, author and professor of mechanical engineering. He was the ninth substantive vice-chancellor of the University of Benin, Nigeria.

References

Nigerian engineers
1954 births
Living people
Auchi Polytechnic alumni
Alumni of Staffordshire University
Alumni of the University of Leeds
Academic staff of the University of Benin (Nigeria)